Kenwood, also known as the John A. Sheppard House, is a historic home located at Huntington, Cabell County, West Virginia. It was designed by the prominent West Virginia architect, H. Rus Warne, and built about 1910, and is a -story, rectangular, side gable house with flanking one-story, enclosed wings with flat roofs covered in green clay tile.  The house measures approximately 100 feet long and 64 feet deep.  It features an entrance portico with two story Tuscan order columns.  The house is in the Classical Revival style with Greek Revival details.  Also on the property is a contributing garage.

It was listed on the National Register of Historic Places in 2007.

References

Neoclassical architecture in West Virginia
Greek Revival houses in West Virginia
H. Rus Warne buildings
Houses completed in 1910
Houses in Huntington, West Virginia
Houses on the National Register of Historic Places in West Virginia
National Register of Historic Places in Cabell County, West Virginia